

The PIK-3 (Polyteknikkojen Ilmailukerho – Finnish institute of technology students flying club) was a sailplane produced in Finland in the 1950s and 60s. It was designed to be a cheap and easy-to-build aircraft to equip the country's gliding clubs as their standard single-seat machine. It was a conventional design for its day, with a high wing and conventional empennage. Construction was of wood throughout, skinned in plywood.

Design work commenced in 1942, but the prototype did not fly until 1950. Antti Koskinen refined the design for production as the PIK-3A and then further modified the design by replacing the flaps with air brakes, which was designated the PIK-3B.

By the end of the 1950s, a third modification of the original design was carried out by Olavi Roininen as the PIK-3C. This had completely new wings of 15 m (49 ft 3 in) to allow it to compete in the Standard Class. The prototype flew on 20 May 1958, and the design was then modified for production by Suomen Ilmailuliitto.

Variants
 PIK-3 – first prototype with wingspan of 13 m (47 ft 8 in)
 PIK-3A Kanttikolmonen – initial production version of PIK-3
 PIK-3B – PIK-3A with air brakes in place of flaps
 PIK-3C Kajava – PIK-3B with new wings of 15 m (49 ft 3 in) span

Specifications (PIK-3c)

See also

Notes

References

 
 
 
 

1950s Finnish sailplanes
PIK aircraft
Glider aircraft
High-wing aircraft
Aircraft first flown in 1950